The Mexico men's national volleyball team represents Mexico in international volleyball competitions. In the 1950s the squad twice won a medal (silver and bronze) at the Pan American Games. The dominant forces in men's volleyball in North and Central America are Cuba and the United States.

Results

Olympic Games
1968 – 10th place
2016 – 11th place

World Championship
1974 – 10th place
1978 – 12th place
1982 – 18th place
2010 – 13th place
2014 – 17th place
2022 – 18th place

NORCECA Championship
1969 – 2nd place  Silver medal
1971 – 3rd place
1975 – 2nd place  Silver medal
1977 – 2nd place  Silver medal
1979 – 3rd place
2001 – 6th place
2003 – 4th place
2005 – 6th place
2007 – 7th place
2011 – 5th place
2013 – 5th place
2015 – 4th place
2017 – 4th place
2019 – 4th place

Pan American Games
1955 – 3rd place 
1959 – 3rd place 
1963 – did not compete
1967 – 4th place
1971 – 5th place
1975 – 3rd place
1979 – 4th place
1983 – did not compete
1987 – did not compete
1991 – did not compete
1995 – did not compete
1999 – did not compete
2003 – did not compete
2007 – 8th place
2011 – 4th place
2015 – 7th place
2019 – 7th place

Pan-American Cup
2006 – 4th place
2007 –  Gold medal
2008 – 4th place
2009 – 5th place
2010 – 7th place
2011 – 5th place
2012 – 5th place
2013 –  Silver medal
2014 – 6th place
2015 – 5th place
2016 – 4th place
2017 – 8th place
2018 – 5th place
2019 –  Bronze medal
2021 –  Gold medal
2022 – 6th place

World League
2014 – 25th place
2015 – 30th place
2016 – 34th place
2017 – 28th place

Current squad
The following is the Mexican roster in the 2022 World Championship.

Head coach:  Jorge Azair

References

External links
Official website
FIVB profile

Volleyball
National men's volleyball teams
Volleyball in Mexico
Men's sport in Mexico